Yekaterina Larionova (born 23 January 1994) is a freestyle wrestler from Kazakhstan. She  won the bronze medal in the 63 kg division at the 2013 World Wrestling Championships.

References

External links
 

Living people
Kazakhstani female sport wrestlers
Wrestlers at the 2014 Asian Games
World Wrestling Championships medalists
Wrestlers at the 2016 Summer Olympics
Olympic wrestlers of Kazakhstan
Olympic bronze medalists for Kazakhstan
Olympic medalists in wrestling
Medalists at the 2016 Summer Olympics
Asian Games competitors for Kazakhstan
21st-century Kazakhstani women
1994 births